Ivri Lider is an Israeli pop star and part of the duo TYP, also known as The Young Professionals. He served as a judge on the first season of The X Factor Israel.

Music career
In October 2005 Lider received the "Male Singer of the Year" award from all the major national and local radio stations. He composed most of the soundtrack for the movie The Bubble, and sings the song "Loving That Man of Mine".

In 2008 Lider launched a new Hebrew album and announced an upcoming English album. The music video for his English-language song "Jesse" has received a lot of airtime on LOGO TV, and Out magazine recognized him as a member of the "Out 100" for 2007.

Personal life
Lider is openly gay. In January 2002, Lider spoke openly about his sexual orientation in a cover-story interview to the daily newspaper Maariv, which attracted a lot of attention.  He later said, "On a personal level, I felt complete and happy with my life and who I am, and I didn't see any reason to not talk about it. It seemed strange to have an interview and not to talk about it, about my boyfriend, about my life. On a less personal level, I felt it's kind of my obligation. When you're an artist and you're doing well and you're successful, you get a lot of love and appreciation and energy and good things from people, and I think you need to give it back. Maybe I can influence people and help younger people that struggle – help them to be able to change their views, and stuff like that." Lider refused to be drawn into the debate about the Jerusalem Gay Pride Parade. He did, however, accept a booking to play at the Sydney Gay and Lesbian Mardi Gras' "Fair Day" in Camperdown, Australia on Sunday, 21 February 2010.

Discography

Albums
(Titles in italics are the Hebrew transliterations—original titles in Hebrew are in parentheses, wherever applicable)
as Ivri Lider

as part of TYP
2011: 9am to 5pm, 5pm to Whenever  (originally 09:00 to 17:00, 17:00 to Whenever)

Movie soundtracks 
 Yossi & Jagger (2002) – original score and theme song "Bo" (Let's)
 Walk on Water (2004) – original score and theme song "Cinderella Rockafella" duet with Rita
 The Bubble (2006) – original score, theme song "The Man I Love", "Birthday Cake", and ending credits song "Song to a Siren"

Group members since 2005
 Ivri Lider
 Yehonatan Sason Fridge
 Amir Rosiano
 Barak Kram
 Adiel Alexander Goldestein
 Roni Arditti
 Ariel Tuchman
 Yogev Mazouz
 Assaf Amdursky

References

External links

 Official website
 Official YouTube channel

1974 births
Living people
21st-century Israeli male singers
Israeli male singer-songwriters
Israeli pop singers
Israeli rock singers
Pop pianists
Rock pianists
Israeli pianists
Pop guitarists
Israeli rock guitarists
Israeli film score composers
People from Central District (Israel)
Israeli people of Polish-Jewish descent
Israeli people of Argentine-Jewish descent
Israeli gay musicians
Gay Jews
Israeli LGBT singers
Israeli LGBT songwriters
Gay songwriters
Gay singers
Gay composers
LGBT film score composers
Male pianists
21st-century pianists
21st-century guitarists
Male film score composers
20th-century LGBT people
21st-century LGBT people